Paula Hernández (born 16 October 1969) is an Argentine film director and screenwriter. She has directed seven films since 1997. Her 2001 film Inheritance was entered into the 23rd Moscow International Film Festival.

Selected filmography
 Inheritance (2001)
 Lluvia (2008)  Rain
 Un amor (2011) a.k.a. One Love
 The Sleepwalkers (2019)

References

External links

1969 births
Living people
Argentine film directors
Argentine screenwriters